CSM1 (RNA name: Csm1p) is a protein that in Saccharomyces cerevisiae strain S288c is encoded by the CSM1 gene.

References

Bibliography

 
 
 
 
 

Saccharomyces cerevisiae genes
Proteins